Columbia Falls is a city along the Flathead River in Flathead County, Montana, United States. The population was 5,308 at the 2020 census. Columbia Falls has been ranked as one of the best and safest places to live in Montana.

History 
The area that would become the city of Columbia Falls was first settled in 1891, in anticipation of the arrival of the Great Northern Railway. On April 26, 1909, the city of Columbia Falls was officially incorporated.

The first residents requested the name "Columbia" for the U.S. Post Office, but the element "Falls" was ultimately tacked onto the name in order to avoid any confusion with the already-named Columbus, Montana.

The Montana Veterans Home in Columbia Falls has served veterans since 1896. Its current housing facility was opened by Montana Governor Forrest H. Anderson at an official dedication ceremony in 1970. An E. M. Viquesney statue of a World War I doughboy was moved to the front of the Veterans' Home in 1972. The statue "originally stood in Kalispell in the Main Street median in front of the Flathead County Courthouse."

Geography 
The City of Columbia Falls is located about a mile from the Flathead National Forest boundary, 15 miles from Kalispell, MT and 17 miles from Glacier National Park.

Demographics

2010 census
At the 2010 census there were 4,688 people, 1,863 households, and 1,215 families living in the city. The racial makup of the city was 94.4% White, 0.2% African American, 1.8% Native American, 0.4% Asian, 0.3% from other races, and 2.9% from two or more races. Hispanic or Latino of any race were 2.8%.

Of the 1,863 households 35.0% had children under the age of 18 living with them, 47.9% were married couples living together, 12.9% had a female householder with no husband present, 4.5% had a male householder with no wife present, and 34.8% were non-families. 28.8% of households were one person and 11% were one person aged 65 or older. The average household size was 2.47 and the average family size was 3.02.

The median age was 35.6 years. 26% of residents were under the age of 18; 8.5% were between the ages of 18 and 24; 26.8% were from 25 to 44; 25.3% were from 45 to 64; and 13.2% were 65 or older. The gender makeup of the city was 48.1% male and 51.9% female.

2000 census
At the 2000 census there were 3,645 people, 1,400 households, and 966 families living in the city. The population density was 2,402.9 people per square mile (925.9/km). There were 1,470 housing units at an average density of 969.1 per square mile (373.4/km). The racial makup of the city was 96.27% White, 0.25% African American, 1.23% Native American, 0.49% Asian, 0.08% Pacific Islander, 0.41% from other races, and 1.26% from two or more races. Hispanic or Latino of any race were 1.84%.

Of the 1,400 households 36.3% had children under the age of 18 living with them, 52.0% were married couples living together, 12.1% had a female householder with no husband present, and 31.0% were non-families. 25.7% of households were one person and 11.0% were one person aged 65 or older. The average household size was 2.52 and the average family size was 3.06.

The age distribution was 28.3% under the age of 18, 8.1% from 18 to 24, 28.6% from 25 to 44, 21.5% from 45 to 64, and 13.4% 65 or older. The median age was 36 years. For every 100 females there were 99.2 males. For every 100 females age 18 and over, there were 97.4 males.

The median household income was $31,128 and the median family income was $40,794. Males had a median income of $32,109 versus $20,023 for females. The per capita income for the city was $14,355. About 12.5% of families and 17.1% of the population were below the poverty line, including 25.8% of those under age 18 and 4.0% of those age 65 or over.

Arts and culture 

Heritage Days is an annual celebration of the town's history and heritage. It occurs on the last weekend of July. Activities include Boogie to the Bank, Wildcat Endowment Auction, a parade and carnival, basketball tournament, a barn dance, car show, rodeo, and the running of wild horses through town on Highway 2.

Night of Lights Parade is an annual December holiday parade.

Columbia Falls has a public library, a branch of the Flathead County Library.

Columbia Falls Community Market is a farmers market held weekly every Thursday from 5pm - 8pm from the second Thursday in May until the last Thursday in September. The market offers live music, food trucks, local produce, locally brewed beer and a rock-climbing wall.

Parks and recreation 
The park has paved walking trails, open meadows, bathroom facilities and a family fly fishing pond.

Pinewood Park Aquatic Center is a public swimming facility located on 4th Ave West. The park also has a basketball court, children's play area, picnic tables and swings.

Government 
The government system of Columbia Falls consists of a City Council with six councilmen and a mayor, elected to four-year terms.

In June 2020, Columbia Falls voters elected to implement a 3% resort tax on all luxury items and services within city limits, more than 50% of the tax revenue is slated to go toward public safety funding.

Education
Schools in Columbia Falls School District Six include Columbia Falls High School, Columbia Falls Junior High School, Glacier Gateway Elementary School, and Ruder Elementary School. School District Six has a approximately 2,400 students. In 2019 voters approved a $37 million school bond which will fund a new Glacier Gateway Elementary School, a 25,000 square foot addition to the Ruder Elementary School, a security upgrade for the Junior High School and new multi-use sports fields.

Columbia Falls High School's mascot is the Wildcats.

The area is served by the ImagineIF library, which also has branches in Bigfork, Kalispell, and Marion.

Transportation 
U.S. Highway 2 runs through Columbia Falls. The North Fork Road (S-486) begins at the junction to U.S. Highway 2 in Columbia Falls and runs to the Canadian border.

Commercial airline service is offered at Glacier Park International Airport located approximately 8 miles south of Columbia Falls.

The Columbia Falls area is served by Amtrak's Chicago-Portland/Seattle Empire Builder, with stops located nearby in Whitefish and West Glacier.

Media 
Columbia Falls is served by Hungry Horse News. The city is also part of the Missoula media market, which covers a seven-county area of northwestern Montana.

KHNK 95.9 FM, (Outlaw Country) and KRVO 103.1 FM are commercial radio stations located in Columbia Falls, broadcasting to the Kalispell-Flathead Valley, Montana, area. KHNK airs a country music format and KRVO airs an adult alternative format.

Notable people
 Douglas Cordier, educator and politician
 Paul Grilley, yoga teacher
 Anthony Kurta, retired US Navy Admiral
 Braxton Mitchell, member of the Montana House of Representatives
 Matt Regier, politician and businessman
 Glenn Roush, politician
 Mel Ruder, Pulitzer Prize winner and publisher emeritus of The Hungry Horse News
 Gloria Jean Siebrecht, paleontologist

Points of interest 
St. Richard's Church. Built in 1891 and listed on the National Register of Historic Places.
 Soldier's Home Historic District. Built in 1895 the facility houses and provides subsistence to veterans and their spouses. 
Flathead River Bridge (also known as the Red Bridge)

See also
 List of cities and towns in Montana

References

External links

 
 Chamber of Commerce

Cities in Montana
Cities in Flathead County, Montana